"Missing You" is a song co-written and recorded by English musician John Waite. It was released in June 1984 as the lead single from his second album, No Brakes (1984). It reached number one on Billboards Album Rock Tracks and on the Hot 100 as well as number 9 on the UK Singles Chart. "Missing You" was the only record from 1984 to spend a single week at the top of the Hot 100. The song was nominated for the 1985 Best Pop Vocal Performance Male Grammy Award.

Waite re-recorded the song with country/bluegrass artist Alison Krauss which appeared on her album A Hundred Miles or More: A Collection, and released it to country music radio in 2007.  The re-recording peaked at number 34 on the Hot Country Songs chart. The original recording has been featured in the films, Selena (1997) and Warm Bodies (2013), the video game Grand Theft Auto: Vice City, and the TV series Miami Vice (from the episode, "Heart of Darkness", originally aired 28 September 1984), as well as in the comedy sitcom Rules of Engagement, in a scene at the diner where there is a flashback of Timmy and Russell's best moments together (season 7, episode "A Wee Problem", originally aired on 6 May 2013).  It also appears in the film 22 Jump Street (2014) during the montage where main characters Schmidt and Jenko begin to miss each other after going their separate ways following a fight.

The song is mentioned by Sheila Weller as describing O. J. Simpson's obsession with Nicole Brown Simpson and is the inspiration for the title of her book Raging Heart.

Composition
The song is a soft rock track.  It is performed in the key of G major with a tempo of 104 beats per minute in common time.  Waite's vocals span from G3 to C5 in the song.

Background

Waite's record label was convinced they had enough songs for the No Brakes album, but he felt it lacked a hit single. He went to a songwriter's house in LA, who showed him a guitar melody on a cassette tape. Waite listened to the melody once through, and the second time, improvised the entire first verse, 'B' section, and "missing you" section without stopping. Waite said the song was about three women in his life: he was getting divorced, and he was thinking of an old love interest from when he first moved to New York City as well as a current love interest. He said, "I was singing about New York, and distance, the caving in of my marriage, and the options that I had. It was bittersweet – it was about the end of my marriage and the beginning of something new. Although, when I was singing ‘I ain’t missing you’, it was denial too." He had to convince the record label to spend $5,000 to record one last single—this one—for the album.

Lyric summary
In the verses/bridge, the singer describes how much he misses his ex-lover, while in the chorus, he lies to himself and vehemently denies missing them.  The opening line "Every time I think of you" is the title of a song by Waite's group The Babys.

Music video
The accompanying music video for "Missing You" was written/directed/produced by Kort Falkenberg III and was actually filmed in Los Angeles during the summer of 1984. Although some people understandably have mistaken the street scene for New York City or London, the director intentionally looked for a location in downtown Los Angeles where there was "no Stucco" on the walls which would have been a dead giveaway that it was shot in the southwest U.S., as he wanted it to look neutral and not be identifiable as any particular city.

To start the clip, John Waite is sitting in a chair, and after seeing a picture of a woman (played by actress Elizabeth Reiko Kubota) with whom he is still in love, he, frustrated, slaps the lamp above him causing it to swing back and forth and begins to sing the song. When he opens his bedroom door, a woman playfully jumps into his arms and they embrace falling back onto the bed. Later, Waite watches through a crack in the door as the woman angrily throws her clothes into her suitcase. She pushes through the door to leave him and it hits him in the face full force as she storms past him, away. Pained at her emotional and physical assault, he sadly remembers being at one of her photo shoots. Trying to be cool, Waite leans on a lighting stand but misses and stumbles. Seeing this, she lovingly laughs at his fumbling. Back to the present, Waite tries to call her from a phone booth, but when the woman finally picks up the phone, her only connection is to a dangling phone in an empty phone booth. Waite is gone. He laments about "I ain't missin' you at all" as he walks down the city street only to see a picture of the woman on a newspaper. He goes into a bar. There, an older woman slides onto the stool next to him and tries to flirt with him, but for sheer sorrow shows he is not interested and then goes home again still pining for the woman. He tries again to call her but his anger and frustration gets the better of him and he smashes the phone into pieces. When she finally comes to his door and knocks, he doesn't answer, as he doesn't hear her knock over the music playing on his earphones he had put on just before her first knock. She leans against the door gently touching it and, with a deep breath, she turns and leaves as tears flow down her face.

Personnel
John Waite – lead and backing vocals
Mark Leonard - keyboards
Gary Myrick – guitars
Bruce Brody – keyboards
Donnie Nossov – bass, backing vocals
Curly Smith – drums
Steve Scales – percussion

Charts and certifications

Weekly charts

Year-end charts

Certifications

Tina Turner version

"Missing You" was also recorded by American singer and actress Tina Turner in 1996, and was released as the third single from her ninth solo album, Wildest Dreams (1996). When Waite's original version of "Missing You" topped Billboard's Hot 100 in late 1984, it ended the reign of Tina Turner's "What's Love Got to Do with It". Turner's version of Waite's "Missing You" hit No. 12 in the UK and No. 84 in the U.S in 1996.
 
The single "Missing You" included an edited single version of the track, an alternative mix and certain formats also the European non-album track "The Difference Between Us", later featured on the U.S. edition of the Wildest Dreams album. The B-side of the U.S. edition of the CD single was the non-album track "Do Something" which was the B-side of the UK single for "On Silent Wings".

Critical reception
Larry Flick from Billboard complimented Turner's version as "a lushly arranged rendition". He wrote, "Under the shrewd guidance of mega-producer Trevor Horn, Turner's distinctive growl is pushed to deliciously dramatic heights and is matched by countless layers of synths and a crisp rock backbeat. The combined attention of the singer's loyalists and those who simply never get enough of this timeless tune should make this cover an instant (and most deserving) winner at top 40 and AC." A reviewer from Music Week rated the song four out of five, adding that "a lottery show appearance and a fine cover of this John Waite hit should do the business for la Turner."

Versions and mixes
 European album version – 4:36
 U.S. album version – 4:40
 Single edit – 4:02
 Alternate mix – 4:04

Music video
The accompanying music video for "Missing You" was directed by Peter Lindbergh and premiered in mid-1996.

Charts

E'voke version

"Missing You" was also recorded by British female vocal duo E'voke in 1997 following their departure from Manifesto Records. James Rudolph provided a rap on the single and as with the previous single "Arms of Loren", there were Steinway and Nip N Tuck remixes (the only version of the Nip N Tuck remix ever released was labelled an edit despite being the full version of the remix). Two promotional CDs were released before Pulse8 went bankrupt. The track was picked up by WEA who commissioned remixes by Metro and Echobeatz (the Echobeatz remix featuring on WEA's 1998 Summer Sampler) with the track scheduled for release in October 1998. The release was pushed back with two new radio edits being promo-ed including a "Christmas version" and a new release date of 14 December 1998.

A video was issued which would later be released to iTunes in 2011 (a video with the Christmas version dubbed over it was also released). The track was finally released on 28 December 1998 and failed to chart. Following this E'voke split up though the CD2 track listing would be released digitally with Pinball records issuing the CD1 track listing on iTunes in 2011. It is unknown if "Missing You" in an original or remixed form will be on the E'voke album due in 2014.

Versions
 Radio Edit 3:43 (on the Pulse8 promo only)
 Nip N Tuck Edit 7:37
 Steinway Mix 5:34
 Steinway Mix Radio Edit 3:51
 Instrumental 3:42 (on the Pulse8 promo only)
 Extended Radio Mix 5:05 (on the Pulse8 promo only)
 Park & Ride Mix 6:28 (on the Pulse8 promo only)
 Round The Block Mix 6:47 (on the Pulse8 promo only)
 Metro Radio Mix 4:20
 R&B Mix Edit 3:59
 Christmas Edit 4:18
 Echobeatz Mix 6:41 (12" release only)

Brooks & Dunn version

This song was also recorded by American country music group Brooks & Dunn and was released in August 1999 as the lead single from the album Tight Rope. Their version peaked at No. 6 on the Canadian RPM Country Tracks, No. 15 on the U.S. Billboard Hot Country Singles & Tracks and reached No. 75 on the U.S. Billboard Hot 100.

Music video
The music video was directed by Deaton Flanigen and premiered in mid-1999.

Charts
"Missing You" peaked at number 15 on the U.S. Billboard Hot Country Singles & Tracks charts for the week of 18 December 1999.

Year-end charts

Re-releases and remakes
Waite re-recorded the song in 2006 as a duet with bluegrass singer Alison Krauss. This re-recording was included on Waite's album Downtown: Journey of a Heart and Krauss's A Hundred Miles or More: A Collection, both released via Rounder Records. The rendition spent 21 weeks on Hot Country Songs between December 2006 and mid-2007, peaking at number 34.

John Waite and Alison Krauss

See also
List of number-one singles of 1984 (Canada)
List of Billboard Hot 100 number-one singles of the 1980s
List of Billboard Mainstream Rock number-one songs of the 1980s
List of Cash Box Top 100 number-one singles of 1984

References

1984 singles
1996 singles
1999 singles
2007 singles
British soft rock songs
John Waite songs
Tina Turner songs
Brooks & Dunn songs
Alison Krauss songs
E'voke songs
Billboard Hot 100 number-one singles
Cashbox number-one singles
RPM Top Singles number-one singles
Music videos directed by Deaton-Flanigen Productions
Male vocal duets
Songs written by John Waite
Song recordings produced by Byron Gallimore
Song recordings produced by Trevor Horn
EMI America Records singles
Parlophone singles
Arista Nashville singles
Warner Music Group singles
Music videos directed by Rocky Schenck
Songs written by Chas Sandford
1984 songs
Rock ballads
Songs about loneliness
1980s ballads